All of Me may refer to:

Film and television 
 All of Me (1934 film), an American drama starring Fredric March
 All of Me (1984 film), an American comedy starring Steve Martin and Lily Tomlin
 All of Me (2014 film), an American documentary about obesity and weight loss surgery
 All of Me (TV series), a 2015 Philippine television series
 "All of Me" (Grey's Anatomy), a 2018 television episode
 "All of Me" (Roseanne), a 1990 television episode

Literature
 All of Me, a 2009 autobiography by Anne Murray

Music

Albums
 All of Me (Amii Stewart album), 1995
 All of Me (Anne Murray album), 2005
 All of Me (Eddie "Lockjaw" Davis album), 1983
 All of Me (Estelle album), 2012
 All of Me (John Pizzarelli album), 1992
 All of Me: The Debonair Mr. Hartman, by Johnny Hartman, 1957
 All of Me – Live in Concert, by Willie Nelson, 2002

Songs
 "All of Me" (jazz standard), a 1931 popular song and jazz standard written by Gerald Marks and Seymour Simons
 "All of Me" (John Legend song), 2013
 "All of Me (Boy Oh Boy)", by Sabrina Salerno, 1988
 "All of Me", by 50 Cent from Curtis
 "All of Me", by Matt Hammitt from Every Falling Tear
 "All of Me", by the Piano Guys from Hits Volume 1

See also 
 Playboy: Farrah Fawcett, All of Me, a 1998 video starring Farrah Fawcett
 All of You (disambiguation)